The Torrey Pines Stakes' is a Grade III American Thoroughbred horse race for three-year-old fillies run over a distance of one mile on the dirt held annually in August at Del Mar Racetrack in Del Mar, California. The event currently carries a purse of $125,000.

History

The event was inaugurated on 10 September 1976 and held in split divisions and was run over a distance of  miles on a rainy day. The event is named after Torrey Pines, a community of in the northern coastal area of San Diego, California and south from Del Mar.

The event was run as a restricted overnight stakes from 1976 to 2004. The last restriction in 2004 was for non-winners of a sweepstakes event where the winner had won $50,000 or more at one mile or over.

The distance of the event was decreased to one mile in 1997. 

This race was upgraded to a Grade III in 2014.

The 2013 winner Beholder went on to win the Breeders' Cup Distaff and was crowned US Champion Three-Year-Old Filly. The 2015 winner Stellar Wind was also crowned US Champion Three-Year-Old Filly that year.

Records
Speed record:
1 mile: 1:34.86 - Potesta (2012) 
 miles: 1:41.00 - Drama Critic (1977) 

Margins:
  lengths - Magical Allure (1998)

Most wins by a jockey:
 4 - Chris McCarron (1981, 1987, 1993, 1998)

Most wins by a trainer:
 7 - John W. Sadler (2003, 2007, 2008, 2009, 2010, 2015, 2018)
 7 - Bob Baffert (1998, 2000, 2005, 2014, 2019, 2021, 2022)

Most wins by an owner:
 2 - Ike & Dawn Thrash   (2008, 2009)
 2 - Michael E. Pegram (2005, 2022)

Winners

Legend:

 
 

Notes:

† In the 2017 running of the event Zapperkat won the race but was disqualified for drifting out in the straight and interfering with Munny Spunt.

See also
 List of American and Canadian Graded races

External links
 2020 Del Mar Media Guide

References

Del Mar Racetrack
Horse races in California
Graded stakes races in the United States
Grade 3 stakes races in the United States
Flat horse races for three-year-old fillies
Recurring sporting events established in 1976
1976 establishments in California